Solomon Rapids is an unincorporated community in Mitchell County, Kansas, United States.

History
A post office was opened in Solomon Rapids in 1870, and remained in operation until it was discontinued in 1953. The community took its name from rapids on the nearby Solomon River.

Education
The community is served by Beloit USD 273 public school district.

See also
 Waconda Lake and Glen Elder State Park.

References

Further reading

External links
 Mitchell County maps: Current, Historic, KDOT

Unincorporated communities in Mitchell County, Kansas
Unincorporated communities in Kansas